Light art or the art of light is generally referring to a visual art form in which (physical) light is the main, if not sole medium of creation. Uses of the term differ drastically in incongruence; definitions, if existing, vary in several aspects. Since light is the medium for visual perception, this way all visual art could be considered light art absurdly enough; but most pieces of art are valid and coherent without reflecting on this basic perceptual fact. Some approaches on these grounds also include into light art those forms of art where light is not any medium contributing to the artwork, but is depicted. Thus, luminism may also refer to light art in the above sense, its previous usage point to painterly styles: either as an other label for the Caravaggisti in the baroque, or 19th and 20th centuries, fundamentally impressionist schools.

Concerning light as a medium of art, historically light art is confined to the use of artificial light in artworks. This culminates in the paradoxical situation in which machines producing light environments are not the artworks themselves, but the artwork is how they modulate their environments, based on the conventionally taken-for granted, thus solely reflected fact that light is what constitutes our environment.

In the broad sense, of which Gerhard Auer stated in 2004:  Any artwork containing something that emits any light may be considered as a piece of light art.

Terms
Closest may be the Lumino kinetic art as a comprehensive term in English, in use from the 1960s. Light Art is a fairly new construction, as a mirror translation from Dutch or German: . The pioneers of light art, being devoted to it, felt the necessity to give it certain names in order to distinguish their art from any other genres of art like painting, sculpture or photography. Even calling the art of light 'the eighth art', Thomas Wilfred termed his works Lumia from 1919 on. László Moholy-Nagy, in his numerous writings from the 1920s on, repeatedly published on 'light architecture' or 'light plays'. Just before lumino-kinetics became widespread, Nicholas Schöffer labeled his own works first as 'spatial dynamic' then 'light dynamic', from 1957 to end up in his 'time dynamic' phase. Frank Malina termed his artworks developed from 1956 on 'lumidyne systems'.

History

The first examples of modern light art appeared after the discovery of electric lighting made long-term lighting safe and affordable at the end of the 19th century. Light art, however, did not become a dedicated form of art until the late 20th century, in large part due to pioneering work begun in 1969, as part of an experimental program at the Los Angeles County Museum of Art, by Robert Irwin and James Turrell.

Modernism, Constructivism and the Bauhaus (1920–1935)

Light has been used for architectural effect throughout human history. However, the modern concept of light art emerged with the development of artificial electric incandescent light sources and experimentation by modern artists of the Constructivist and Bauhaus movements. "Prounenraum (Proun Room) (1923), by El Lissitzky, is considered by many art historians to be the first time an artist incorporated architectural lighting elements as a component integral to his work." The first object-based light sculpture was the Light-Space Modulator (1922–1930), by László Moholy-Nagy. Experimentation and innovations in theatrical light have often influenced other areas of light use such as light art. The development of Modernism and the electric light go hand-in-hand; the idea of the modern city with high-rises and electric light epitomizes this development.

All visual art uses light in some form, but in modern photography and motion pictures, use of light is especially important. However, with the invention of electrical artificial light, possibilities expanded and many artists began using light as the main form of expression, rather than solely as a vehicle for other forms of art. Constructivist Naum Gabo experimented with the transparent materiality light reflects on an object; his Linear Construction No. 1 (1943) provides an example of this. Marcel Duchamp's Hat Rack (1916 and 1964), hangs from the ceiling and casts a shadow against the wall.

Large-scale displays of light require the collaboration of the authorities.
An early example is the utilization of the majority of the searchlights of the German Air Force by Albert Speer for his Cathedral of Light, an impressive feature of the Nazi Party rallies at Nuremberg between 1934 and 1938.

Art critic Hilarie M. Sheets explains that "the interplay of dark and light has been a theme running from Greek and Roman sculpture to Renaissance painting to experimental film. But as technology advanced from the glow of the electric light bulb to the computer monitor, artists have been experimenting with actual light as material and subject."

Lumino kinetic and op art (1950–1970)

Minimalism

Neon art (1980s)

Projection mapping

Closely associated art forms are projectors, 3-D projection, multi-media, video art, and photography where light technology projects images rather than using light as the medium. Large light festivals and events have helped to develop the use of light on large canvases such as architectural facades, building projections, the flood lighting of buildings with colour, and interactive media facades. These forms of light art have their antecedents in new media-based, video art and photography which are sometimes classified as light art since light and movement are important to the work.

Digital graffiti

Also included in the light art genre is the so-called light graffiti including projection onto buildings, arrangement of lighted windows in buildings, and painting with hand-held lights onto film using time exposure.

Light painting

Lightpainting

Light art installations 
An example of a light art installation was that of artists Mel and Dorothy Tanner, who began adding light to their paintings and sculptures at their studio in Miami, Florida, in 1967. This was the same time period as that of Light and Space artists James Turrell and Robert Irwin in Los Angeles, on the opposite U.S. coast. The Tanners worked very closely for over 40 years until Mel Tanner died in 1993. Their main project was the creation of Lumonics that consists of their light sculptures, live projection, video, electronics and music as a total art installation. Author and art historian Michael Betancourt described this conceptual art as a Gesamtkunstwerk in his book The Lumonics Theater: The Art of Mel & Dorothy Tanner, published in 2004. Dorothy Tanner, born in 1923, continues her light art from her studio in Denver, and co-directs the Lumonics School of Light Art with Marc Billard.

Displays

Museums
Many modern art museums include light sculptures and installations in their permanent and temporary collections.  The Centre for International Light Art in Unna, Germany is currently the world's only museum dedicated exclusively to the collection and presentation of light art.

The Light Art Museum in Eindhoven, Netherlands, another museum dedicated to the display of light art, closed on 5 December 2010 due to insufficient funding, but at the Strijp-S complex, one can see the Fakkel by Har Hollands, Daan Roosegaarde's Crystal as well as part of the light festival GLOW.

Many well-known art museums, such as the San Francisco Museum of Modern Art and the Museum of Modern Art in New York, often have temporary light art exhibits and installations in their galleries.

Light festivals
Light festivals and the smart city LED revolution were driven by outdoor urban light sculpture with low energy LED luminaires. Light artists were able to create new exhibition spaces collectively in the form of light art festivals. These festivals have continued to grow internationally and help to highlight ecological change. This LED low energy movement dates back to 2009 and the Vivid Smart Light Festival in Sydney. In Singapore, the i Light Marina Bay festival—Asia's only sustainable light festival—was first hosted in 2010. There are many light art festivals, especially in Europe, including the Signal Festival in Prague and the Ghent Light Festival. Light festivals and LEDs have redefined light art as an art genre.

Light Art Awards
The World Light Art Award, presented by the Centre for International Light Art Unna and the RWE Foundation, is given to up-and-coming artists who will contribute "to the development of light art in an innovative and creative way" and has been in existence since 2015.

The award is meant to encourage artists to explore light art, despite the difficulties the relatively new style faces, including the financial and technical requirements needed for a light art exhibit.  The foundations behind the ILAA also wish to put emphasis on sustainability and new technologies within the medium of light expression.

The Australian and New Zealand Engineering Illumination Society, ANZIES, began giving an annual award to light artists at the Vivid Light Festival in 2010.  
Vivid Light festival grants help support local and international light artists in the pursuit of their medium.
In 2015 the DARC awards, supported by Mondo Arc Magazine, began selecting winners for their light art awards.
The International Association of Lighting Design, the IALD, a North American-based organization, also gives out an annual award for light art.

Light Art Videos
The luminous experience of electricity was very successful at the Vivid Festival in 2013, the same year the German group Kraftwerk performed there. A few years later, they themselves projected a light show in combination with their hits on Museum_Kunstpalast in Düsseldorf. The topic of light also plays a role in music videos, such as the one by artist Marc Engelhard, and is visually represented in a wide variety of ways.

Artists working with light

See also

LED art
Snow lantern
Kunsthalle Detroit, a light art institution

References

Further reading 
.
.
JanLeonardo Woellert & Joerg Miedza - Painting With Light: Light Art Performance Photography, Rocky Nook; 1 Edition (10 April 2011), .
Crisafulli, Fabrizio. 2013. Active Light. Issues of Light in Contemporary Theatre, Dublin: Artdigiland. .

External links

Centre for International Light Art (CILA), Unna
International Forum of Light in Art and Design
International Center for Contemporary Art dedicated to multimedia and light art
Light art from Artificial Light
Smashing Magazine Let There Be Light: Light Paintings and Sculptures
Galleries of Light-Art Association, by Kalos Fund, Scotland
Luceonline.it, the cultural portal of light and new technologies
Oslo Lux